was a poet and philologist of the early  Edo period. His ideas had a germinal impact on the nativist school of National Learning in Japan.

Life
Azumamaro was born the second son of Hakura Nobuaki (1625-1696), father of a scholarly family that for generations had supplied Shinto priests to the Inari shrine in Fushimi. From an early age he studied traditional Japanese poetry, waka, and Shinto thought and belief, and his precocity was such that he was soon employed, in 1697, as poetry tutor to one of the sons of Emperor Reigen (regnabat 1663–1687).

Fushimi at the time had been described by Ihara Saikaku as an economically depressed town that had fallen down in its fortunes. This marked it off from the flourishing cultural developments of the Genroku period. He set up an academy for studying and teaching his nativist ideas in the Inari shrine.

In 1700 he settled in Edo, where his students mainly came from the Shinto clergy whom he instructed in norito prayers and the Shinto liturgy, though the curriculum also encompassed such ancient texts as the Man'yōshū and the Nihon Shoki. His studies in the former classic profited particularly from the Buddhist priest Keichū, and together these two figures may be considered as founding fathers of the movement of nativist thought known as kokugaku ("national studies").

Azumamaro remained in Edo until 1713, when he returned to Fushimi. After a short time, he returned to Edo for a year on a stipend, but then retired to pursue his work in his native Fushima, where he was frequently consulted by members of the Bakufu regarding antiquarian matters regarding ancient court ceremonies and customs. He died by his own hand, after enduring many years of illness, in 1736.

He developed an approach which  drew a clear distinction between what was considered the native tradition of Japan from the prevalent socio-political orthodoxy of his day, Confucianism, but also sought to disentangle Japanese religion from the other major form of foreign thought, Buddhism. He regarded these foreign systems of belief and thought in adversarial terms.

Kamo no Mabuchi, likewise the son of a Shinto priest and, like Azumamaro not of samurai origins, who was to become a major scholar of ancient literature, first met Azumamaro in 1722, and subsequently enrolled to study under him in 1728, and moving to Kyoto in 1733 to be taught by Azumamaro on a more permanent basis.

Reputation
Within a century of his passing, Hirata Atsutane described Kada no Azumamaro as the first of Kokugaku's 'great men' (taijin/ushi). Kokugaku, together with the kogaku (古学: "Ancient Studies") school founded by Kamo no Mabuchi laid the foundations for both the renaissance of interest in Japanese classical poetry and culture, and for the nativist critique of Confucian ideology which was to prove of great ideological importance during and after the transformation of Tokugawa Japan into the modernizing nation of that country under Emperor Meiji .

See also
 Japanese nationalism
 Kokugaku
 Motoori Norinaga
 Hirata Atsutane

Notes and references

Notes

References

1669 births
1736 deaths
Kokugaku scholars
Japanese writers of the Edo period
17th-century Japanese poets
Deified Japanese people
17th-century Japanese philosophers
18th-century Japanese philosophers